Church of Saint-Nicolas of Bodružal is a Greek-catholic church situated in the village of Bodružal.

History 
The church was constructed in wood in 1658 by the parishioners. On July 7, 2008, the church along with seven other monuments was declared UNESCO world heritage site under the name "Wooden Churches of the Slovak part of the Carpathian Mountain Area".

References 

Wooden churches
World Heritage Sites in Slovakia
Slovak Greek Catholic churches
Wooden buildings and structures in Slovakia
17th-century Roman Catholic church buildings in Slovakia
Churches completed in 1658